Ilesfay Technology Group LLC was a technology firm that provided cloud based replication and data delivery solutions. Ilesfay was venture-backed, with the lead investor being CincyTechUSA.  The firm announced via their website that they had been acquired by San Francisco based Autodesk, Inc. in 2014.

Intellectual property
On August 15, 2012, Ilesfay received US patent #8,244,831 titled Method for the Preemptive Creation of Binary Delta Information within a Computer Network for their cloud-based delta encoding/binary differencing methods.
On March 26, 2013, Ilesfay received US patent #8,407,315 titled Method for Horizontal Scale Delta Encoding.
On November 26, 2013, Ilesfay received US patent #8,595,187 titled Serialization for Delta Encoding.

Investors
Early angel investors in Ilesfay included Cincinnati Reds owner Bob Castellini.

PointToCloud
PointToCloud represents the Ilesfay file management and distribution architecture.  This architecture defines a cloud-based distribution system that enables delivery of unstructured data without traditional leased line, point-to-point network connectivity. The architecture enables location-independent network participation and consistent connectivity.

Location
Ilesfay's replication services ran in six geographically distributed regions within Amazon AWS: California, Virginia, Brazil, Ireland, Singapore and Tokyo.

References

External links
 

Technology companies established in 2009
Technology companies disestablished in 2014
Software companies established in 2009
Software companies disestablished in 2014
Software companies based in Ohio
Defunct companies based in Cincinnati
Defunct software companies of the United States
Defunct technology companies of the United States
American companies established in 2009
American companies disestablished in 2014